The women's tournament of Water polo at the 2016 Summer Olympics at Rio de Janeiro, Brazil, began on 9 August and ended on 19 August 2016. Games were held at the Maria Lenk Aquatics Centre and the Olympic Aquatics Stadium.

The United States won the gold medal by defeating Italy 12–5 in the final. Russia captured bronze, beating Hungary 19–18.

Competition schedule

Qualification

Draw
The draw was held on 10 April 2016.

Teams from eight nations compete in the tournament and were seeded into two groups for the preliminary round.

Seeding
The seeding was announced on 10 April 2016.

Referees
The following referees were selected for the tournament.

 German Moller
 Daniel Flahive
 Mark Koganov
 Fabio Toffoli
 Marie-Claude Deslières
 Ni Shi Wei
 Nenad Peris
 Hatem Gaber
 Benjamin Mercier
 Georgios Stavridis
 Péter Molnár
 Masoud Rezvani
 Fillippo Gomez
 Tadao Tahara
 Stanko Ivanovski
 Diana Dutilh-Dumas
 Radosław Koryzna
 Adrian Alexandrescu
 Sergey Naumov
 Vojin Putniković
 Boris Margeta
 Dion Willis
 Francesc Buch
 Joseph Peila

Preliminary round

Group A
All times are BRT (UTC-3).

Group B
All times are BRT (UTC-3).

Final round
Final Bracket

5th place bracket

Quarterfinals
All times are BRT (UTC-3).

5th–8th place classification
All times are BRT (UTC-3).

Semifinals
All times are BRT (UTC-3).

7th place match
All times are BRT (UTC-3).

5th place match
All times are BRT (UTC-3).

Bronze medal match
All times are BRT (UTC-3).

Gold medal match
All times are BRT (UTC-3).

Ranking and statistics

Final ranking

Multi-time Olympians

Four-time Olympian(s): 1 player
 : Tania Di Mario

Three-time Olympian(s): 12 players
 : Gemma Beadsworth, Bronwen Knox
 : Ma Huanhuan, Sun Yating, Yang Jun (GK)
 : Orsolya Takács
 : Teresa Frassinetti
 : Nadezhda Glyzina-Fedotova, Ekaterina Lisunova, Ekaterina Prokofyeva, Evgenia Soboleva
 : Kami Craig

Multiple medalists

Three-time Olympic medalist(s): 1 player
 : Kami Craig

Top goalscorers

Source: Rio2016

Top goalkeepers

Source: Rio2016

Medalists

Awards
The women's all-star team was announced on 19 August 2016.

Most Valuable Player
  Maggie Steffens (17 goals, 1 sprints won)

Media All-Star Team
 Goalkeeper
  Ashleigh Johnson (51 saves)
 Field players
  Barbara Bujka (centre forward, left-handed, 15 goals)
  Arianna Garibotti (12 goals)
  Rita Keszthelyi (14 goals, 10 sprints won)
  Maddie Musselman (12 goals)
  Ashleigh Southern (14 goals)
  Maggie Steffens (17 goals, 1 sprints won)

See also

 Water polo at the 2016 Summer Olympics – Men's tournament

References

Sources
 PDF documents in the Olympic World Library:
 Official Results Book – 2016 Olympic Games – Water Polo (archive)
 Water polo on the Olympedia website
 Water polo at the 2016 Summer Olympics (women's tournament)
 Water polo on the Sports Reference website
 Water polo at the 2016 Summer Games (women's tournament) (archived)

Women's tournament
2016 in women's water polo
Women's water polo competitions
Women's events at the 2016 Summer Olympics